Ingrid Rentsch (4 June 1928 – December 2022) was a German stage, film and television actress.

Rentsch was married to Hans-Joachim Martens. She was the mother of the actor Florian Martens. She died in December 2022.

Selected filmography
 The Beaver Coat (1949)
 Corinna Schmidt (1951)
 The Charming Young Lady (1953)
 Happy Voyage (1954)

References

Bibliography
 Gilman, Sander. Jurek Becker: A Life in Five Worlds. University of Chicago Press, 2003.

External links

1928 births
2022 deaths
German television actresses
German stage actresses
German film actresses
Actresses from Berlin